Civil Aeronautics Administration may refer to:
Civil Aeronautics Administration (Taiwan) - a division of Ministry of Transportation and Communication, Executive Yuan, Republic of China
Civil Aeronautics Administration (United States) - established in 1940 by President Franklin D. Roosevelt